The Phi Delta Theta Fraternity House is a historic three-story house in Lincoln, Nebraska. It was built in 1937 with limestone by the Olson Construction Company, and designed in the Art Deco style by architect Martin I. Aitken. It houses the University of Nebraska-Lincoln chapter of the Phi Delta Theta fraternity, founded in 1875. It has been listed on the National Register of Historic Places since May 28, 1986.

References

National Register of Historic Places in Lincoln, Nebraska
Art Deco architecture in Nebraska
Houses completed in 1937
1937 establishments in Nebraska
Fraternity and sorority houses
Phi Delta Theta